Order of Research is one of the badges of honor in Iran, established by "Council of Iran Ministers" on November 21, 1990. According to "Article 8" of the "Regulations on the Awarding of Government Orders" of Iran, the "Order of Research" is awarded to individuals who have been the origin of fundamental transformation or rare service in the following ways:

 Introducing new research methods and techniques
 Studies and research that are the source of scientific change
 Finding new research methods
 Transfer of fundamental research to applied fields
 Every important innovation, originality, invention, and discovery

Recipients

Types
The "Order of Research" has three types of medal:

See also
 Order of Freedom (Iran)
 Order of Altruism
 Order of Work and Production
 Order of Mehr
 Order of Justice (Iran)
 Order of Construction
 Order of Knowledge
 Order of Education and Pedagogy
 Order of Persian Politeness
 Order of Independence (Iran)
 Order of Service
 Order of Courage (Iran)
 Order of Culture and Art
 Order of Merit and Management
 Order of Fath
 Order of Islamic Republic
 Order of Nasr

References

External links
 Orders of Iran Regulations in diagrams
 Orders of Iran in diagrams
 Types of Iran's badges and their material benefits

CS1 uses Persian-language script (fa)
Awards established in 1990
Civil awards and decorations of Iran
1990 establishments in Iran